The Scrub Lady, also known as Tillie the Scrub Lady, is a 1917 American silent comedy short film produced by and starring Marie Dressler and distributed by Goldwyn Pictures. The picture is preserved in the Library of Congress.

Vincent P. Bryan was a composer, lyricist and writer. He had helmed nearly all of Charles Chaplin's Mutual films. The newly created Goldwyn Pictures brought Bryan in to write The Scrub Lady.

Dressler portrayed Tillie in three other films, including the first full-length comedy, Tillie's Punctured Romance (1914), with Charles Chaplin and Mabel Normand, as well as Tillie's Tomato Surprise (1915) and Tillie Wakes Up (1917). Tillie has a different last name in Tillie Wakes Up, which could be explained by the fact that her character is married.

Cast
 Marie Dressler as Tillie
 Max Davidson (in still photo with Dressler)

References

External links

 
 Still of Marie Dressler from the film, Max Davidson on the left (University of Washington, Sayre collection)

1917 films
American silent short films
Goldwyn Pictures films
1917 comedy films
Silent American comedy films
1917 short films
American black-and-white films
American comedy short films
1910s American films